Franck Guillemard (born April 28, 1975) is a French former professional ice hockey centre.

Guillemard played for Lions de Lyon between 1992 and 2000 and Brûleurs de Loups between 2000 and 2003. He also played for France during the 1999 IIHF World Championship.

References

External links

1975 births
Living people
Brûleurs de Loups players
French ice hockey centres
LHC Les Lions players
Sportspeople from Nancy, France